This is a list of yearly Mid-America Intercollegiate Athletics Association football standings.

Mid-America standings

References

Standings
Mid-America Intercollegiate Athletics Association